Maurice Orbach (13 July 190224 April 1979) was a British Labour Party politician, who served the Willesden East (1945-1959) and Stockport South (1964-1979) constituencies.

Background
Born to a Jewish family, Orbach was educated at technical college in Wales and as an extramural student at New York University.

Career

Public service
Orbach was a lifelong member of Poale Zion (Great Britain).

He was general secretary of the Jewish Trades Advisory Council ("a committee of the Board of Deputies of British Jews, aimed at countering anti-Semitism in business life" during World War II) from 1940 and remained its secretary until his death.

He was chairman of Central Middlesex Group hospital management committee.

He was active in the World Jewish Congress (WJC).  In 1954, on behalf of both the WJC and Winston Churchill, he went to Cairo to help save the lives of Jews sentenced to death as part of the Lavon Affair.  Later, he said that Egypt's President, Gamal Abdel Nasser, had agreed to spare their lives but then reneged to balance their deaths with members of Muslim Brotherhood.

Political service

Orbach contested Huntingdonshire in the 1931 election and Willesden East in 1935 and in a 1938 by-election. In 1937 he was elected to the London County Council, representing St Pancras South West.

Orbach was elected Member of Parliament for Willesden East in 1945, serving until his defeat in 1959, and for Stockport South from 1964 until Parliament dissolved for the 1979 general election; he died two weeks later, nine days before polling day. His successor was Thomas McNally.

Personal life and death

In 1935, Orbach married Ruth Hubsch, an American, who later taught English to refugees from Nazi Germany.  She served as chairman of Pioneer Women (later renamed British Na'amat).  She died in 1983.

Maurice Orbach died age 76 on 24 April 1979.

Daughter Susie is a psychotherapist, writer and co-founder of The Women's Therapy Centre in London. Son Laurence taught history at Columbia University, New York, before founding Quarto Publishing in London in 1976 and served as chairman and CEO of The Quarto Group, Inc.

Legacy

At his death in 1979, the Jewish Telegraphic Agency called him a "prominent leader of Anglo Jewry" and stated "a stalwart Zionist, he was a founder of the Labour Friends of Israel."

In 2010 The Guardian referred to him as "a self-proclaimed Labour Zionist who had conspicuously failed to support Israel during the Suez crisis."

Work
Books
 Austria, 1946 (1946)

References

External links
 Trades Advisory Council Archive at University College London
 
Times Guide to the House of Commons October 1974

 
 National Archives:  Letter of 13 Feb 1957 from Maurice Orbach MP, enclosing telegrams from constituents urging UK government to oppose sanctions against Israel
 They Speak for You:  417 speeches by Maurice Orbach (1945-1979)
 Getty Images:  Photo of Maurice Orbach in 1952
 Getty Images:  Photo of Maurice Orbach in 1972
 Palestine Poster Project:  "Nationalist Worker! Be Ready To Show Your Strength" by Maurice Orbach (1937)

1902 births
1979 deaths
Labour Party (UK) MPs for English constituencies
UK MPs 1945–1950
UK MPs 1950–1951
UK MPs 1951–1955
UK MPs 1955–1959
UK MPs 1964–1966
UK MPs 1966–1970
UK MPs 1970–1974
UK MPs 1974
UK MPs 1974–1979
Members of London County Council
Jewish British politicians